The electoral district of Frankston is an electoral district of the Victorian Legislative Assembly. It currently includes the suburbs of Frankston and Frankston South south east of Melbourne.

The electorate was first created prior to the 1967 election and the Liberal Party held the seat until the Cain landslide of 1982. Population increases, however, meant the seat was abolished in 1985 and replaced by two electorates—Frankston South and Frankston North.

In 1992, Frankston South was replaced mostly by a recreated Frankston.  It became very safe for the Liberal Party, who won it with margins well over 10%.

However the adjoining Labor-held seat of Frankston East—which had been created mostly out of the old Frankston North—was abolished prior to the 2002 election and much of its territory was incorporated into the seat.  The old Frankston had a comfortably safe Liberal majority of 10.7 percent, but the redistribution reduced it to a quite marginal 3.2 percent.  Labor's Alistair Harkness won the seat on a large swing, part of the Labor landslide at the 2002 election. He was returned at the 2006 election with a reduced majority, but was defeated in 2010 by Geoff Shaw.

Members for Frankston

Election results

Graphical summary

References

External links
 Electorate profile: Frankston District, Victorian Electoral Commission

Electoral districts of Victoria (Australia)
1967 establishments in Australia
1985 disestablishments in Australia
1992 establishments in Australia
Frankston, Victoria
City of Frankston
Electoral districts and divisions of Greater Melbourne